A list of football seasons contested by AFC Ajax in both domestic and international competitions.

Seasons

Notes

References

Seasons
 
Ajax